The Women's World Championship was the first women's professional wrestling world title.

History
Cora Livingston defeated  Hazel Parker in 1906. Though the contest was originally for the Featherweight Championship, from that point she was billed as the first women's champion of the world. She then went to face women's champion Laura Bennett in a champion vs champion match in 1910. While Livingston was proclaimed as world champion, Laura was simply referred as women's champion. The match saw Cora Livingston victorious and it was at that time she was officially recognized as the first women's world champion.

Mildred Burke won a woman's world championship title in 1937 and held it for close to two decades. Mildred Burke won the women's wrestling world championship title defeating Clara Mortenson the inaugural champion. Clara had competed for the vacant championship against Barbara Ware, with Clara coming out victorious, following her victory, she was billed as the first women's world champion. On June 14, 1953, June Byers won a 13-woman tournament in Baltimore to claim the belt. She quickly became a popular fan favorite champion. Byers and Burke wrestled a two out of three falls match in 1954 it went to a no contest. Subsequently, Byers was recognized as the NWA World Women's Champion, and Burke went on to create the WWWA World Championship and was recognized as its first champion.

Title history

See also
World Heavyweight Wrestling Championship (original version)
Women's World Tag Team Championship
NWA World Women's Champion
WWWA World Championship
World Women's Championship (disambiguation)

References

National Wrestling Alliance championships
World professional wrestling championships
Women's professional wrestling championships